Song Everlasting is an album by the Don Pullen-George Adams Quartet recorded in 1987 for the Blue Note label.

Reception
The Allmusic review by Richard S. Ginell awarded the album 4 stars stating "a jubilant followup to Breakthrough, which marked the group's American label debut. Here there is a little more stylistic diversity, along with plenty of melodic invention and fireworks on the outside".

Track listing
All compositions by Don Pullen except as indicated
 "Sun Watchers" (George Adams) 5:43 
 "Serenade for Sariah (Adams) 7:35 
 "1529 Gunn Street" - 6:14
 "Warm Up" - 9:50
 "Sing Me a Song Everlasting" - 10:30 
 "Another Reason to Celebrate" - 8:44 Bonus track on CD only
Recorded in New York City on April 21, 1987

Personnel
Don Pullen – piano
George Adams – tenor saxophone, flute
Cameron Brown – bass
Dannie Richmond – drums

References

Blue Note Records albums
Don Pullen albums
George Adams (musician) albums
1987 albums
Collaborative albums